George E. Porter is an American sound engineer. He won four Primetime Emmy Awards and was nominated for eighteen more in the category Outstanding Sound Mixing.

Filmography 
 Summer Children (1965)
 Lions Love (1969)
 Angels Die Hard (1970)
 The Thing with Two Heads (1972)
 Dirty Little Billy (1972)
 Jennifer (1978)
 California Dreaming (1979)
 The Evictors (1979)
 Amber Waves (1980)

References

External links 

Possibly living people
Place of birth missing (living people)
Year of birth missing (living people)
American audio engineers
20th-century American engineers
Primetime Emmy Award winners